The women's high jump at the 2000 Summer Olympics as part of the athletics program was held at the Stadium Australia on Thursday, 28 September and Saturday, 30 September.

Medalists

Schedule
All times are Australian Eastern Standard Time (UTC+10)

Records

Results
All distances shown are in meters.

 DNS denotes did not start.
 DNF denotes did not finish.
 DQ denotes disqualification.
 NR denotes national record.
 AR denotes area/continental record.
 OR denotes Olympic record.
 WR denotes world record.
 PB denotes personal best.
 SB denotes season best

Qualifying round

NM = no mark
All four athletes who failed to register a height, had three failures at 1.80 m.

Final

References

External links

Official Report of the 2000 Sydney Summer Olympics

Athletics at the 2000 Summer Olympics
High jump at the Olympics
2000 in women's athletics
Women's events at the 2000 Summer Olympics